Amoa may refer to:

People

Surname
 Kofi Amoa-Abban, Ghanaian Oil and Gas entrepreneur
 Kwaku Amoa-Awuah (1926–2015), Ghanaian politician
 Basilea Amoa-Tetteh (born 1984), Ghanaian women's international footballer

Given name
 Amoa Tausilia (born 1922), Western Samoan former chief and politician

Other uses
 Amoa River, a river in northeastern New Caledonia
 Ammonia monooxygenase (AmoA), an enzyme